Lake Gőtés is a lake of Hungary.

References
Védett növények és állatok
 Mesél Óbuda földje / Guckler Károly Természetvédelmi Alapítvány (Budapest; 1998.)

Gotes